Trumped is a 2009 American thriller short film written and directed by Michael Whitton and starring James James, Matt Kawczynski, and David Whitton. The film follows the spree of a three-man costumed gang bent on scaring people for fun.

Premise
The film is focused around a demented scare game that the desensitized players: Greg (James), Anthony (Kawczynski), and Tommy (Whitton) think is harmless and the random victims believe is real; but when an accident blurs the two, the players are forced to face a consequence that trumps all the rest.

Cast
(in order of appearance)
 James James as Greg (Blue), a thrill-seeker
 David Whitton as Tommy (Red), Greg's roommate
 Matt Kawczynski as Anthony (Green), Greg's friend by default
 Tamara Gschaider as Mia, young attack victim
 Kathy Corrigan as Ima, old attack victim
 Larry Whitton as Gentleman, Ima's husband
 Jaime Whitton as Girl, a potential attack victim
 Rodney Amieva as Dude, Girl's friend
 Ray Chavez, Jr. as Mello, a hoodie gangster
 Rene Arreola as Once, a hoodie gangster
 David Fernandez as Keso, a hoodie gangster

Production
Trumped was shot in Super 16mm on location in Los Angeles, California.

Accolades
 Winner BEST DRAMA at the 2010 Ivy Film Festival
 Winner BEST SHORT at the 2010 FirstGlance Short Online Contest
 Winner PREMIERE at the FirstGlance Film Fest Philadelphia TwentyTen (Shorts Too)
 SEMI-FINALIST at the 2011 Action/Cut Short Film Competition
 Shortlisted at 2010 Visionfest and the 2011 Independents' Film Festival.

See also
Aestheticisation of violence
Adrenaline junkie
Hooliganism

References

External links
 
 

American independent films
2009 short films
2009 films
American short films
2000s English-language films
2000s American films
2009 independent films